The Vijayanagara Empire (also called the Karnata Kingdom) coverered much of the region of South India, controlling the lands of the modern states of Karnataka, Andhra Pradesh, Tamil Nadu, Kerala, Goa and some parts of Telangana and Maharashtra. It was established in 1336 by the brothers Harihara I and Bukka Raya I of the Sangama dynasty, members of a pastoralist cowherd community that claimed Yadava lineage. The empire rose to prominence as a culmination of attempts by the southern powers to ward off Perso-Turkic Islamic invasions by the end of the 13th century. At its peak, it subjugated almost all of South India's ruling families and pushed the sultans of the Deccan beyond the Tungabhadra-Krishna river doab region, in addition to annexing Gajapati Kingdom (Odisha) till Krishna river, thus becoming a notable power. It lasted until 1646, although its power declined after a major military defeat in the Battle of Talikota in 1565 by the combined armies of the Deccan sultanates. The empire is named after its capital city of Vijayanagara, whose ruins surround present day Hampi, now a World Heritage Site in Karnataka, India. The wealth and fame of the empire inspired visits by and writings of medieval European travelers such as Domingo Paes, Fernão Nunes, and Niccolò de' Conti. These travelogues, contemporary literature and epigraphy in the local languages, and modern archeological excavations at Vijayanagara have provided ample information about the history and power of the empire.

The empire's legacy includes monuments spread over South India, the best known of which is the group at Hampi. Different temple building traditions in South and Central India were merged into the Vijayanagara architecture style. This synthesis inspired architectural innovations in the construction of Hindu temples. Efficient administration and vigorous overseas trade brought new technologies to the region such as water management systems for irrigation. The empire's patronage enabled fine arts and literature to reach new heights in Kannada, Telugu, Tamil, and Sanskrit with topics such as astronomy, mathematics, medicine, fiction, musicology, historiography and theater gaining popularity. The classical music of Southern India, Carnatic music, evolved into its current form. The Vijayanagara Empire created an epoch in the history of Southern India that transcended regionalism by promoting Hinduism as a unifying factor.

Alternative names
Karnata Rajya (Karnata Kingdom) was another name for the Vijayanagara Empire, used in some inscriptions and literary works of the Vijayanagara times including the Sanskrit work Jambavati Kalyanam by King Krishnadevaraya and Telugu work Vasu Charitamu. According to historians including Vasundhara Kavali-Filliozat, B. A. Saletore, P. B. Desai, and Ram Sharma, "although Robert Sewell mentioned in the body of the text that the empire was called Karnataka, he chose Vijayanagar in the title because he knew Kannada and Telugu groups would fight if he called it Karnataka." As per the historical records exist from the inscriptions available in historical ruins of the empire, it was called Karnataka Samrajya (translated in English to Karnataka Empire).

Europeans referred to the Vijayanagara Empire as "The Kingdom of Narasinga", a name derived from "Narasimha" by the Portuguese.  It is not clear whether the name was derived from Saluva Narasimha Deva Raya or Narasimha Raya II.

History

Background and origin theories

Before the early 14th-century rise of the Vijayanagara Empire, the Hindu states of the Deccan – the Yadava Empire of Devagiri, the Kakatiya dynasty of Warangal, and the Pandyan Empire of Madurai – were repeatedly raided and attacked by Muslims from the north. By 1336 the upper Deccan region (modern-day Maharashtra and Telangana) had been defeated by armies of Sultan Alauddin Khalji and Muhammad bin Tughluq of the Delhi Sultanate.

He created the Kampili kingdom near Gulbarga and Tungabhadra River in the northeastern parts of present-day Karnataka state.

Two theories have been proposed regarding the linguistic origins of the Vijayanagara empire. One is that Harihara I and Bukka I, the founders of the empire, were Kannadigas and commanders in the army of the Hoysala Empire stationed in the Tungabhadra region to ward off Muslim invasions from Northern India. Another theory is that Harihara and Bukkaraya were Telugu people, first associated with the Kakatiya Kingdom, who took control of the northern parts of the Hoysala Empire during its decline. They were believed to have been captured by the army of Ulugh Khan at Warangal. According to tradition, based on a Telugu-narrative, the founders were supported and inspired by Vidyaranya, a saint at the Sringeri monastery, to fight the Muslim invasion of South India, but the role of Vidyaranya in the founding of the Vijayanagara Empire is not certain.

Early years
In the first two decades after the founding of the empire, Harihara I gained control over most of the area south of the Tungabhadra River and earned the title of "master of the eastern and western seas" (Purvapaschima Samudradhishavara). By 1374 Bukka Raya I, successor to Harihara I, defeated the chiefdom of Arcot, the Reddys of Kondavidu, and the Sultan of Madurai, and had gained control over Goa in the west and the Tungabhadra-Krishna River doab in the north. The original capital of the empire was in the principality of Anegondi on the northern banks of the Tungabhadra River in today's Karnataka. It was moved to Vijayanagara during Bukka Raya I's reign because it was easier to defend against the Muslim armies, who were persistently attacking from the northern lands.

With the Vijayanagara Kingdom now imperial in stature, Harihara II, the second son of Bukka Raya I, further consolidated the kingdom beyond the Krishna River and South India was controlled by the Vijayanagara Empire. The next ruler, Deva Raya I, was successful against the Gajapatis of Odisha and undertook works of fortification and irrigation. Firuz Bahmani of Bahmani Sultanate entered into a treaty with Deva Raya I in 1407 that required the latter to pay Bahmani an annual tribute of "100,000 huns, five maunds of pearls and fifty elephants". The Sultanate invaded Vijayanagara in 1417 when the latter defaulted in paying the tribute. Such wars for tribute payment by Vijayanagara were repeated in the 15th century.

Deva Raya II (eulogized in contemporary literature as Gajabetekara) succeeded to the throne in 1424. He was possibly the most successful of the Sangama Dynasty rulers. He quelled rebelling feudal lords and the Zamorin of Calicut and Quilon in the south. He invaded Sri Lanka and became overlord of the kings of Burma at Pegu and Tanasserim. By 1436 the rebellious chiefs of Kondavidu and the Velama rulers were successfully dealt with and had to accept Vijayanagara overlordship. After a few years of tranquility, wars broke out with the Bahamani Sultanate in 1443 with some successes and some reversals. The Persian visitor Firishta attributes Deva Raya II's war preparations, which included augmenting his armies with Muslim archers and cavalry, to be the cause of the conflict. Contemporary Persian ambassador Abdur Razzak attributes the war to the Bahamani Sultan capitalizing on the confusion caused by an internal revolt within the Vijayanagara Empire, including an attempt to assassinate the Raya by his brother.

Deva Raya II was succeeded by his elder son Mallikarjuna Raya in 1446. The Gajapati king removed the Vijayanagara control over the Tamil country by occupying the Reddi kingdoms of Rajahmundry, Kondaveedu, Kanchipuram, and Tiruchirapalli. These defeats reduced the Vijayanagara Empire's prestige, described by an inscription which described the Gajapati king as "a yawning lion to the sheep of the Karnatak King". Mallikarjuna's successor Virupaksha Raya II led a life of pleasure perusing wine and women leading to the loss of Goa and much of Karnataka to the Bahmani Sultanate. His governor Saluva Narasimha reduced the loss of territory by holding almost all of coastal Andhra Pradesh south of the Krishna river, Chittoor, the two Arcots and Kolar. Saluva Narashimha defeated the Gajapatis and held Udayagiri, drove out the Pandyas from Tanjore, and took procession of Machilipatnam and Kondaveedu. He later defeated Bahmani forces and recovered most of the empire's earlier losses.

After the death of Virupaksha Raya II in 1485, Saluva Narasimha led a coup that ended the dynastic rule while continuing to defend the empire from raids by the Sultanates created from the continuing disintegration of the Bahmani Sultanate in its north. Saluva Narasimha left his two adolescent sons under the care of general Tuluva Narasa Nayaka who ably defended the kingdom from their traditional enemies, the Gajapati king and the Bahamani Sultan. He also subdued rebelling chiefs of the Chera, the Chola and the Pandya territories. Despite many attempts by nobles and members of the royal family to overthrow him, Narasa Nayaka retained control as a regent king till 1503.

In 1503, Narasa Nayaka's son Vira Narasimha had prince Immadi Narasimha of the Saluva dynasty assassinated and took over the rule in a coup thus becoming the first of the Tuluva dynasty rulers. This did not go well with the nobles who revolted. Seeing internal troubles grow, the Gajapati king and the Bahamani Sultan began to encroach on the empire even as the governors of Ummattur, Adoni, and Talakad colluded to capture the Tungabhadra-Krishna river doab region from the empire. The empire came under the rule of Krishna Deva Raya in 1509, another son of Tuluva Narasa Nayaka. Initially Krishnadevaraya faced a many obstacles including dissatisfied nobles, the rebellious chief of Ummattur in the south, a resurgent Gajapati kingdom under King Prataparudra, a growing threat from the newly formed Adil Shahi Sultanate of Bijapur under Yusuf Adil Khan and Portuguese interest in controlling the west coast. Not one to be unnerved by these pressures he strengthened and consolidated the empire, one victory at a time. He was an astute king who hired both Hindus and Muslims into his army. In the following decades, the empire covered Southern India and successfully defeated invasions from the five established Deccan Sultanates to its north.

Empire's peak

The empire reached its peak during the rule of Krishna Deva Raya when Vijayanagara armies were consistently victorious. The empire gained territory formerly under the Sultanates in the northern Deccan, such as Raichur and Gulbarga from the Bahamani Sultanate, territories in the eastern Deccan from wars with Sultan Quli Qutb Shahi of Golkonda, and Kalinga region from the Gajapatis of Odisha. This was in addition to the already established presence in the southern Deccan. Many important monuments were either completed or commissioned during the time of King Krishnadevaraya.

Krishna Deva Raya was succeeded by his younger half-brother Achyuta Deva Raya in 1529. When Achyuta Deva Raya died in 1542, Sadashiva Raya, the teenage nephew of Achyuta Raya, was appointed king, and Rama Raya, Krishna Deva Raya's son-in-law, becoming the caretaker. When Sadashiva Raya was old enough to assert his independent claim over the throne, Rama Raya made him a virtual prisoner and became the de facto ruler. He hired Muslim generals in his army from his previous diplomatic connections with the Sultanates and called himself "Sultan of the World". He was keen interfering in the internal affairs of the various Sultanates and on playing off the Muslim powers against one another, while making himself the ruler of the most powerful and influential regional power. This worked for a while but eventually made him very unpopular among his people and the Muslim rulers. He made a commercial treaty with the Portuguese to stop the supply of horses to Bijapur, then defeated the Bijapur ruler and inflicted humiliating defeats on Golconda and Ahmednagar.

Defeat and decline

Eventually the Deccan sultanates to the north of Vijayanagara united and attacked Rama Raya's army in January 1565 in the Battle of Talikota. Regarding the Vijayanagara defeat in battle, Kamath opines that the Sultanate armies, though numerically disadvantaged, were better equipped and trained. Their artillery was manned by expert Turkish gunmen while the Vijayanagara army depended on European mercenaries using outdated artillery. The Sultanate cavalry rode fast moving Persian horses and used spears that were fifteen to sixteen feet long giving them a greater reach, and their archers used metal cross bows which enabled them to reach longer distance targets. In comparison, the Vijayanagara army depended on slow moving war elephants, a cavalry riding mostly locally bred weaker horses wielding shorter reach javelines, and their archers used traditional bamboo bows with a shorter range. Despite these disadvantages, Kamath, Hermann Kulke and Dietmar Rothermund concur that the vast Vijayanagara army appeared to have the upper hand until two Muslim generals (identified as the mercenary Gilani brothers according to Kamath) switched sides and joined forces with the Sultanates turning the tide decisively in favor of the Sultanates. The generals captured Rama Raya and beheaded him, and Sultan Hussain had the severed head stuffed with straw for display. Rama Raya's beheading created confusion and havoc in the Vijayanagara army, which were then completely routed. The Sultanates' army plundered Hampi and reduced it to the ruinous state in which it remains today.

After Rama Raya's death, Tirumala Deva Raya started the Aravidu dynasty, founded a new capital of Penukonda to replace the destroyed Hampi, and attempted to reconstitute the remains of Vijayanagara Empire. Tirumala abdicated in 1572, dividing the remains of his kingdom to his three sons. The Aravidu dynasty successors ruled the region but the empire collapsed in 1614, and the final remains ended in 1646, from continued wars with the Bijapur sultanate and others. During this period, more kingdoms in South India became independent and separate from Vijayanagara, including the Nayakas of Chitradurga, Keladi Nayaka, Mysore Kingdom, Nayak Kingdom of Gingee, Nayaks of Tanjore, and Nayaks of Madurai.

Governance
 

The rulers of the Vijayanagara Empire maintained the administrative methods developed by their predecessors, the Hoysala, Kakatiya and Pandya kingdoms. The King, ministry, territory, fort, treasury, military, and ally formed the seven critical elements that influenced every aspect of governance. The King was the ultimate authority, assisted by a cabinet of ministers (Pradhana) headed by the prime minister (Mahapradhana). Other important titles recorded were the chief secretary (Karyakartha or Rayaswami) and the imperial officers (Adhikari). All high-ranking ministers and officers were required to have military training. A secretariat near the king's palace employed scribes and officers to maintain records made official by using a wax seal imprinted with the ring of the king. At the lower administrative levels, wealthy feudal landlords (Gowdas) supervised accountants (Karanikas or Karnam) and guards (Kavalu). The palace administration was divided into 72 departments (Niyogas), each having several female attendants chosen for their youth and beauty (some imported or captured in victorious battles) who were trained to handle minor administrative matters and to serve men of nobility as courtesans or concubines.

The empire was divided into five main provinces (Rajya), each under a commander (Dandanayaka or Dandanatha) and headed by a governor, often from the royal family, who used the native language for administrative purposes. A Rajya was divided into regions (Vishaya, Vente or Kottam) and further divided into counties (Sime or Nadu), themselves subdivided into municipalities (Kampana or Sthala). Hereditary families ruled their respective territories and paid tribute to the empire, while some areas, such as Keladi and Madurai, came under the direct supervision of a commander.

On the battlefield, the king's commanders led the troops. The empire's war strategy rarely involved massive invasions; more often it employed small-scale methods such as attacking and destroying individual forts. The empire was among the first in India to use long-range artillery, which were commonly manned by foreign gunners. Army troops were of two types: the king's personal army directly recruited by the empire and the feudal army under each feudatory. King Krishnadevaraya's personal army consisted of 100,000 infantry, 20,000 cavalrymen, and over 900 elephants. The whole army was claimed to number over 1.1 million soldiers, with up to 2 million having been recorded, along with a navy led by a Navigadaprabhu (commander of the navy). The army recruited from all classes of society, supported by the collection of additional feudal tributes from feudatory rulers, and consisted of archers and musketeers wearing quilted tunics, shieldmen with swords and poignards in their girdles, and soldiers carrying shields so large that armour was not necessary. The horses and elephants were fully armoured and the elephants had knives fastened to their tusks to do maximum damage in battle.

The capital city was dependent on water supply systems constructed to channel and store water, ensuring a consistent supply throughout the year. The remains of these hydraulic systems have given historians a picture of the prevailing surface water distribution methods in use at that time in the semiarid regions of South India. Contemporary records and notes of foreign travellers describe huge tanks constructed by labourers. Excavations uncovered the remains of a well-connected water distribution system existing solely within the royal enclosure and the large temple complexes (suggesting it was for the exclusive use of royalty, and for special ceremonies) with sophisticated channels using gravity and siphons to transport water through pipelines. In the fertile agricultural areas near the Tungabhadra River, canals were dug to guide the river water into irrigation tanks. These canals had sluices that were opened and closed to control the water flow. In other areas, the administration encouraged digging wells, which were monitored by administrative authorities. Large tanks in the capital city were constructed with royal patronage while smaller tanks were funded by wealthy individuals to gain social and religious merit.

Economy

The economy of the empire was largely dependent on agriculture. Rice, Sorghum (jowar), cotton, and pulse legumes grew in semi-arid regions, while sugarcane, and wheat thrived in rainy areas. Betel leaves, areca (for chewing), and coconut were the principal cash crops, and large-scale cotton production supplied the weaving centers of the empire's vibrant textile industry. Spices such as turmeric, pepper, cardamom, and ginger grew in the remote Malnad hill region and were transported to the city for trade. The empire's capital city was a thriving business centre that included a burgeoning market in large quantities of precious gems and gold. Prolific temple-building provided employment to thousands of masons, sculptors, and other skilled artisans.

According to Abdur Razzak, much of the empire was fertile and well cultivated. Most of the growers were tenant farmers and were given the right of part ownership of the land over time. Tax policies encouraging needed produce made distinctions between land use to determine tax levies. For example, the daily market availability of rose petals was important for perfumers, so cultivation of roses received a lower tax assessment. Salt production and the manufacture of salt pans were controlled by similar means. The making of ghee (clarified butter), which was sold as an oil for human consumption and as a fuel for lighting lamps, was profitable. Exports to China intensified and included cotton, spices, jewels, semi-precious stones, ivory, rhino horn, ebony, amber, coral, and aromatic products such as perfumes. Large vessels from China made frequent visits and brought Chinese products to the empire's 300 ports, large and small, on the Arabian Sea and the Bay of Bengal. The ports of Mangalore, Honavar, Bhatkal, Barkur, Cochin, Cannanore, Machilipatnam, and Dharmadam were important for they not only provided secure harbors for traders from Africa, Arabia, Aden, the Red sea, China and Bengal but some also served as ship building centers.

When merchant ships docked, the merchandise was taken into official custody and taxes levied on all items sold. The security of the merchandise was guaranteed by the administration officials. Traders of many nationalities (Arabs, Persians, Guzerates, Khorassanians) settled in Calicut, drawn by the thriving trade business. Ship building prospered and keeled ships between 1000 and 1200 bahares (burden) were built without decks by sewing the entire hull with ropes rather than fastening them with nails. Ships sailed to the Red Sea ports of Aden and Mecca with Vijayanagara goods sold as far away as Venice. The empire's principal exports were pepper, ginger, cinnamon, cardamom, myrobalan, tamarind timber, anafistula, precious and semi-precious stones, pearls, musk, ambergris, rhubarb, aloe, cotton cloth and porcelain. Cotton yarn was shipped to Burma and indigo to Persia. Chief imports from Palestine were copper, quicksilver (mercury), vermilion, coral, saffron, coloured velvets, rose water, knives, colored camlets, gold and silver. Persian horses were imported to Cannanore before a two-week land trip to the capital. Silk arrived from China and sugar from Bengal.

East coast trade routes were busy, with goods arriving from Golkonda where rice, millet, pulses and tobacco were grown on a large scale. Dye crops of indigo and chay root were produced for the weaving industry. A mineral rich region, Machilipatnam was the gateway for high quality iron and steel exports. Diamond mining was active in the Kollur region. The cotton weaving industry produced two types of cottons, plain calico and muslin (brown, bleached or dyed). Cloth printed with coloured patterns crafted by native techniques were exported to Java and the Far East. Golkonda specialised in plain cotton and Pulicat in printed. The main imports on the east coast were non-ferrous metals, camphor, porcelain, silk and luxury goods.

Mahanavami festival marked the beginning of a financial year from when the state treasury accounted for and reconciled all outstanding dues within nine days. At this time, an updated annual assessment record of provincial dues, which included rents and taxes, paid on a monthly basis by each governor was created under royal decree.

Temples were taxed for land ownership to cover military expenses. In the Telugu districts the temple tax was called Srotriyas, in the Tamil speaking  districts it was called as Jodi. Taxes such as Durgavarthana, Dannayivarthana  and Kavali Kanike were collected towards protection of movable and immovable wealth from robbery and invasions. Jeevadhanam was collected for cattle graze on non-private lands. Popular temple destinations charged visitor fees called Perayam or Kanike. Residential property taxes were called Illari.

Culture

Social life

The Hindu social order was prevalent and it influenced daily life in the empire. The rulers who occupied the top of this hierarchy assumed the honorific Varnasramadharma (lit, "helpers of the four classes and four stages"). According to Talbot, caste was more importantly determined by occupation or the professional community people belonged to, although the family lineage (Gotra) and the broad distinction described in sacred Hindu texts were also factors. The structure also contained sub-castes and caste clusters ("Jati"). According to Vanina, caste as a social identity was not fixed and was constantly changed for reasons including polity, trade and commerce, and was usually determined by context. Identification of castes and sub-castes was made based on temple affiliations, lineage, family units, royal retinues, warrior clans, occupational groups, agricultural and trade groups, devotional networks, and even priestly cabals. It was also not impossible for a caste to lose its position and prestige and slip down the ladder while others rose up the same. Epigraphy studies by Talbot suggests that members within a family could have different social status based on their occupation and the upward movement of a caste or sub-caste was not uncommon based on the breakthroughs achieved by an individual or a group of individuals from the community.

Caste affiliation was closely tied to craft production and members of a common craft formed collective memberships. Often members of related crafts formed inter-caste communities. This helped them consolidate strength and gain political representation and trade benefits. According to Talbot, terminology such as Setti was used to identify communities across merchant and artisan classes while Boya identified herders of all types. Artisans consisted of blacksmiths, goldsmiths, brasssmiths and carpenters. These communities lived in separate sections of the city to avoid disputes, especially when it came to social privileges. Conquests led to large-scale migration of people leading to marginalisation of natives of a place. The Tottiyans were shepherds who later gained marginal ruling status (poligars),  Saurashtrans were traders who came from present-day Gujarat and rivalled the Brahmins for some benefits, the Reddys were agriculturists and the Uppilia were salt farmers.

According to Chopra et al., in addition to their monopoly over priestly duties, Brahmins occupied high positions in political and administrative fields. The Portuguese traveler Domingo Paes observed an increasing presence of Brahmins in the military. The separation of the priestly class from material wealth and power made them ideal arbiters in local judicial matters, and the nobility and aristocracy ensured their presence in every town and village to maintain order. Vanina notes that within the warrior class was a conglomerate of castes, kinship and clans that usually originated from landholding and pastoral communities. They ascended the social ladder by abandoning their original occupations and adopting to a martial code of living, ethics and practices. In South India they were loosely called the Nayakas.

Sati practice is evidenced in Vijayanagara ruins by several inscriptions known as Satikal (Sati stone) or Sati-virakal (Sati hero stone). There are controversial views among historians regarding this practice including religious compulsion, marital affection, martyrdom or honor against subjugation by foreign intruders.

The socio-religious movements that gained popularity in the previous centuries, such as Lingayatism, provided momentum for flexible social norms that helped the cause of women. By this time South Indian women had crossed most barriers and were actively involved in fields hitherto considered the monopoly of men such as administration, business, trade and the fine arts. Tirumalamba Devi who wrote Varadambika Parinayam and Gangadevi the author of Madhuravijayam were among the notable women poets of the Sanskrit language. Early Telugu women poets such as Tallapaka Timmakka and Atukuri Molla became popular. Further south the provincial Nayaks of Tanjore patronised several women poets. The Devadasi system, as well as legalized prostitution, existed and members of this community were relegated to a few streets in each city. The popularity of harems among men of the royalty and the existence of seraglio is well known from records.

Well-to-do men wore the Petha or Kulavi, a tall turban made of silk and decorated with gold. As in most Indian societies, jewellery was used by men and women and records describe the use of anklets, bracelets, finger-rings, necklaces and ear rings of various types. During celebrations men and women adorned themselves with flower garlands and used perfumes made of rose water, civet musk, musk, or sandalwood. In stark contrast to the commoners whose lives were modest, the lives of royalty were full of ceremonial pomp. Queens and princesses had numerous attendants who were lavishly dressed and adorned with fine jewellery. Their numbers ensured their daily duties were light.

Physical exercises were popular with men and wrestling was an important male preoccupation for sport and entertainment, and women wrestlers are also mentioned in records. Gymnasiums have been discovered inside royal quarters and records mention regular physical training for commanders and their armies during peacetime. Royal palaces and marketplaces had special arenas where royalty and common people amused themselves by watching sports such as cock fight, ram fight and female wrestling. Excavations within the Vijayanagara city limits have revealed the existence of various community-based gaming activities. Engravings on boulders, rock platforms and temple floors indicate these were popular locations of casual social interaction. Some of these are gaming boards similar to the ones in use today and others are yet to be identified.

Dowry was in practice and can be seen in both Hindu and Muslim royal families. When a sister of Sultan Adil Shah of Bijapur was married to Nizam Shah of Ahmednagar, the town of Sholapur was given to the bride by her family. Ayyangar notes that when the Gajapati King of Kalinga gave his daughter in marriage honoring the victorious King Krishnadevaraya he included several villages as dowry. Inscriptions of the 15th and 16th centuries record the practice of dowry among commoners as well. The practice of putting a price on the bride was a possible influence of the Islamic Mahr system. To oppose this influence, in the year 1553, the Brahmin community passed a mandate under royal decree and popularized the kanyadana within the community. According to this practice money could not be paid or received during marriage and those who did were liable for punishment. There is a mention of Streedhana ("woman's wealth") in an inscription and that the villagers should not give away land as dowry. These inscriptions reinforce the theory that a system of social mandates within community groups existed and were widely practiced even though these practices did not find justification in the family laws described in the religious texts.

Religion

The Vijayanagara kings were tolerant of all religions and sects, as writings by foreign visitors show. The kings used titles such as Gobrahamana Pratipalanacharya (literally, "protector of cows and Brahmins") that testified to their intention of protecting Hinduism, and yet at the same time adopted Islamicate court ceremonies, dress, and political language, as reflected in the title Hindu-rāya-suratrāṇa (lit, "sultan among Hindu kings"). The empire's founders, the Sangama brothers (Harihara I and Bukka Raya I) came from a pastoral cowherd background, possibly the Kuruba people, that claimed Yadava lineage. The founders of the empire were devout Shaivas (worshippers of the Hindu god Shiva) but made grants to Vishnu temples. Their patron saint Vidyaranya was from the Advaita order at Sringeri. The Varaha (the boar avatar of Vishnu) was the emblem of the empire. Over one-fourth of the archaeological dig found an "Islamic Quarter" not far from the "Royal Quarter". Nobles from Central Asia's Timurid kingdoms also came to Vijayanagara. The later Saluva and Tuluva kings were Vaishnava (followers of Vishnu) by faith, but also worshipped Venkateshwara (Vishnu) at Tirupati as well as Virupaksha (Shiva) at Hampi. A Sanskrit work, Jambavati Kalyanam by King Krishnadevaraya, refers to Virupaksha as Karnata Rajya Raksha Mani ("protective jewel of Karnata Empire"). The kings patronised the saints of the dvaita order (philosophy of dualism) of Madhvacharya at Udupi. Endowments were made to temples in the form of land, cash, produce, jewellery and constructions.

The Bhakti (devotional) movement was active during this time, and involved well known Haridasas (devotee saints) of that time. Like the Virashaiva movement of the 12th century, this movement presented another strong current of devotion, pervading the lives of millions. The Haridasas represented two groups, the Vyasakuta and Dasakuta, the former being required to be proficient in the Vedas, Upanishads and other Darshanas, while the Dasakuta merely conveyed the message of Madhvacharya through the Kannada language to the people in the form of devotional songs (Devaranamas and Kirthanas). The philosophy of Madhvacharya was spread by eminent disciples such as Naraharitirtha, Jayatirtha, Sripadaraya, Vyasatirtha, Vadirajatirtha and others. Vyasatirtha, the guru (teacher) of Vadirajatirtha, Purandaradasa (Pitamaha or "Father of Carnatic music") and Kanakadasa earned the devotion of King Krishnadevaraya. The king considered the saint his Kuladevata (family deity) and honoured him in his writings. During this time, another great composer of early carnatic music, Annamacharya composed hundreds of Kirthanas in Telugu at Tirupati in present-day Andhra Pradesh.

The defeat of the Jain Western Ganga Dynasty by the Cholas in the early 11th century and the rising numbers of followers of Vaishnava Hinduism and Virashaivism in the 12th century was mirrored by a decreased interest in Jainism. Two notable locations of Jain worship in the Vijayanagara territory were Shravanabelagola and Kambadahalli.

Islamic contact with South India began as early as the seventh century, a result of trade between the Southern kingdoms and Arab lands. Jumma Masjids existed in the Rashtrakuta empire by the tenth century and many mosques flourished on the Malabar coast by the early 14th century. Muslim settlers married local women; their children were known as Mappillas (Moplahs) and were actively involved in horse trading and manning shipping fleets. The interactions between the Vijayanagara empire and the Bahamani Sultanates to the north increased the presence of Muslims in the south. In the early 15th century, Deva Raya built a mosque for the Muslims in Vijayanagara and placed a Quran before his throne.

The introduction of Christianity began as early as the eighth century as shown by the finding of copper plates inscribed with land grants to Malabar Christians. Christian travelers wrote of the scarcity of Christians in South India in the Middle Ages, promoting its attractiveness to missionaries. The arrival of the Portuguese in the 15th century and their connections through trade with the empire, the propagation of the faith by Saint Xavier (1545) and later the presence of Dutch settlements fostered the growth of Christianity in the south.

Epigraphs, sources and monetization

Stone inscriptions were the most common form of documents used on temple walls, boundary of properties and open places for public display. Another form of documentation was on copper plates that were meant for record keeping. Usually verbose inscriptions included information such as a salutation, a panegyric of the king or local ruler, the name of the donor, nature of the endowment (generally either cash or produce), the manner in which the grant would be used, obligations of the donee, share received by the donor and a concluding statement that officiated the entire donation and its obligations. Some inscriptions record an instance of victory in war or religious festival, and retribution or a curse on those who do not honor the grant.

Most Vijayanagara empire inscriptions recovered so far are in Kannada, Telugu and Tamil, and a few in Sanskrit. According to Suryanath U. Kamath about 7000 stone inscriptions, half of which are in Kannada, and about 300 copper plates which are mostly in Sanskrit, have been recovered. Bilingual inscriptions had lost favor by the 14th century. According to Mack, the majority of the inscriptions recovered are from the rule of the Tuluva dynasty (from 1503 to 1565) with the Saluva dynasty (from 1485 to 1503) inscribing the least in its brief control over the empire. The Sangama dynasty (from 1336 to 1485) which ruled the longest produced about one third of all epigraphs inscribed during the Tuluva period. Despite the popularity of Telugu language as a literary medium, the majority of the epigraphs in the language were inscribed in the limited period from 1500 to 1649. Talbot explains this scenario as one of shifting political solidarity. The Vijayanagara empire was originally founded in Karnataka, with Andhra Pradesh serving as a province of the empire. After its defeat to the Sultanates in 1565 and the sacking of the royal capital Vijayanagara, the diminished empire moved its capital to Southern Andhra Pradesh, creating an enterprise dominated by Telugu language.

In addition to epigraphs and coins, the sources of Vijayanagara history (its origin, social and political life and eventual defeat) are the accounts of foreign travelers and contemporary literary sources in Sanskrit, Kannada, Persian and Telugu. The Portuguese visitors to the empire were Domingo Paes (1522), Fernão Nunes (1537), Duarte Barbosa (1516) and Barradas (1616), and Athanasius Nikitin (1470) came from Russia. Niccolò de' Conti (1420), Ludovico di Varthema (1505), Caesar Fredericci (1567) and Filippo Sassetti (1585) were travelers from Italy and Abdur Razzak (1443) visited from Persia. Contemporary Muslim writers who were either under the patronage of rival kingdoms (the Sultanates) or were visitors to Vijayanagara and accomplished valuable works are Ziauddin Barani (Tarikh-i-Firuz Shahi, 1357), Isamy (Fatuhat us salatin), Syed Ali Tabatabai (Burhan-i-Maisar, 1596), Nisammuddin Bakshi, Firishta (Tarik-i-Firishta) and Rafiuddin Shirazi (Tazkirat ul Mulk, 1611). Among writings by native authors, the important Sanskrit works that shed light on the empire are Vidyaranya Kalajnana, Dindima's Ramabhyudayam on the life of King Saluva Narasimha, Dindima II's Achyutabhyudayam and Tirumalamba's Varadambika Parinayam. Among Kannada literary works, Kumara Ramana Kathe by Nanjunda Kavi, Mohanatarangini by Kanakadasa, Keladiripavijayam by Linganna and the recently discovered Krishnadevarayana Dinachari are useful sources, and among Telugu works, Srinatha's Kashikanda, Mallayya and Singayya's Varahapuranamu, Vishvanatha Nayani's Rayavachakamu, Nandi Timmanna's Parijathapaharanamu, Durjati's Krishnaraja Vijayamu, Peddanna's Manucharitamu and King Krishnadevaraya's Amuktamalyada are important sources of information.
  
The Persian visitor Abdur Razzak wrote in his travelogues that the empire enjoyed a high level of monetization. This is especially evident from the number of temple cash grants that were made. Coins were minted using gold, silver, copper and brass and their value depended on material weight. Coins were minted by the state, in the provinces and by merchant guilds. Foreign currency was in circulation. The highest denomination was the gold Varaha (or Hun/Honnu, Gadyana) weighted 50.65  53 grains. The Partab or Pratapa was valued at half a Varaha, the Fanam, Phanam or Hana, an alloy of gold and copper was the most common currency valued at a third of the Varaha. A Tar made of pure silver was a sixth of a Phanam and a Chital made of brass was a third of the Tar. Haga, Visa and Kasu were also coins of lower denominations.

Literature

During the rule of the Vijayanagara Empire, poets, scholars and philosophers wrote primarily in Kannada, Telugu and Sanskrit, and also in other regional languages such as Tamil and covered such subjects as religion, biography, Prabandha (fiction), music, grammar, poetry, medicine and mathematics. The administrative and court languages of the Empire were Kannada and Telugu, the latter gained even more cultural and literary prominence during the reign of the last Vijayanagara kings, especially Krishnadevaraya.

Most Sanskrit works were commentaries either on the Vedas or on the Ramayana and Mahabharata epics, written by well known figures such as Sayanacharya (who wrote a treatise on the Vedas called Vedartha Prakasha whose English translation by Max Muller appeared in 1856), and Vidyaranya that extolled the superiority of the Advaita philosophy over other rival Hindu philosophies. Other writers were famous Dvaita saints of the Udupi order such as Jayatirtha (earning the title Tikacharya for his polemical writings), Vyasatirtha who wrote rebuttals to the Advaita philosophy and of the conclusions of earlier logicians, and Vadirajatirtha and Sripadaraya both of whom criticized the beliefs of Adi Sankara. Apart from these saints, noted Sanskrit scholars adorned the courts of the Vijayanagara kings and their feudal chiefs. Some members of the royal family were writers of merit and authored important works such as Jambavati Kalyana by King Krishnadevaraya, and Madura Vijayam (also known as Veerakamparaya Charita) by Princess Gangadevi, a daughter-in-law of King Bukka I, dwells on the conquest of the Madurai Sultanate by the Vijayanagara empire.

The Kannada poets and scholars of the empire produced important writings supporting the Vaishnava Bhakti movement heralded by the Haridasas (devotees of Vishnu), Brahminical and Veerashaiva (Lingayatism) literature. The Haridasa poets celebrated their devotion through songs called Devaranama (lyrical poems) in the native meters of Sangatya (quatrain), Suladi (beat based), Ugabhoga (melody based) and Mundige (cryptic). Their inspirations were the teachings of Madhvacharya and Vyasatirtha. Purandaradasa and Kanakadasa are considered the foremost among many Dasas (devotees) by virtue of their immense contribution. Kumara Vyasa, the most notable of Brahmin scholars wrote Gadugina Bharata, a translation of the epic Mahabharata. This work marks a transition of Kannada literature from old Kannada to modern Kannada. Chamarasa was a famous Veerashaiva scholar and poet who had many debates with Vaishnava scholars in the court of Devaraya II. His Prabhulinga Leele, later translated into Telugu and Tamil, was a eulogy of Saint Allama Prabhu (the saint was considered an incarnation of Lord Ganapathi while Parvati took the form of a princess of Banavasi).

At this peak of Telugu literature, the most famous writing in the Prabandha style was Manucharitamu. King Krishnadevaraya was an accomplished Telugu scholar and wrote the Amuktamalyada, a story of the wedding of the god Vishnu to Andal, the Tamil Alvar saint poet and the daughter of Periyalvar at Srirangam. In his court were eight famous scholars regarded as the pillars (Ashtadiggajas) of the literary assembly. The most famous among them were Allasani Peddana who held the honorific Andhrakavitapitamaha (lit, "father of Telugu poetry") and Tenali Ramakrishna, the court jester who authored several notable works. The other six poets were Nandi Thimmana (Mukku Timmana), Ayyalaraju Ramabhadra, Madayyagari Mallana, Bhattu Murthi (Ramaraja Bhushana), Pingali Surana, and Dhurjati. Srinatha, who wrote books such as Marutratcharitamu and Salivahana-sapta-sati, was patronised by King Devaraya II and enjoyed the same status as important ministers in the court.

Most Tamil literature from this period came from Tamil-speaking regions, which were ruled by the feudatory Pandya who gave particular attention to the cultivation of Tamil literature. Some poets were also patronised by the Vijayanagara kings. Svarupananda Desikar wrote an anthology of 2824 verses, Sivaprakasap-perundirattu, on the Advaita philosophy. His pupil the ascetic, Tattuvarayar, wrote a shorter anthology, Kurundirattu, that contained about half the number of verses. Krishnadevaraya patronised the Tamil Vaishnava poet Haridasa whose Irusamaya Vilakkam was an exposition of the two Hindu systems, Vaishnava and Shaiva, with a preference for the former.

Notable among secular writings on music and medicine were Vidyaranya's Sangitsara, Praudha Raya's Ratiratnapradipika, Sayana's Ayurveda Sudhanidhi and Lakshmana Pandita's Vaidyarajavallabham. The Kerala school of astronomy and mathematics flourished during this period with scholars such as Madhava, who made important contributions to trigonometry and calculus, and Nilakantha Somayaji, who postulated on the orbitals of planets.

Architecture

Vijayanagara architecture, according to art critic Percy Brown is a vibrant combination and blossoming of the Chalukya, Hoysala, Pandya and Chola styles, idioms that prospered in previous centuries. Its legacy of sculpture, architecture and painting influenced the development of the arts long after the empire came to an end. Its stylistic hallmark is the ornate pillared Kalyanamantapa (marriage hall), Vasanthamantapa (open pillared halls) and the Rayagopura (tower). Artisans used the locally available hard granite because of its durability since the kingdom was under constant threat of invasion. An open-air theatre of monuments at its capital at Vijayanagara is a UNESCO World Heritage Site.

In the 14th century, the kings continued to build vesara or Deccan-style monuments but later incorporated Dravida-style gopuras to meet their ritualistic needs. The Prasanna Virupaksha temple (underground temple) of Bukka and the Hazare Rama temple of Deva Raya are examples of Deccan architecture. The varied and intricate ornamentation of the pillars is a mark of their work. At Hampi, the Vitthala and Hazara Ramaswamy temples are examples of their pillared Kalyanamantapa style. A visible aspect of their style is their return to the simplistic and serene art developed by the Chalukya dynasty. The Vitthala temple took several decades to complete during the reign of the Tuluva kings.

Another element of the Vijayanagara style is the carving and consecration of large monoliths such as the Sasivekaalu (mustard) Ganesha and Kadalekaalu (ground nut) Ganesha at Hampi, the Gommateshwara (Bahubali) monoliths in Karkala and Venur, and the Nandi bull in Lepakshi. The Vijayanagara temples of Kolar, Kanakagiri, Sringeri and other towns of Karnataka; the temples of Tadpatri, Lepakshi, Ahobilam, Tirumala Venkateswara Temple and Srikalahasti in Andhra Pradesh; and the temples of Vellore, Kumbakonam, Kanchi and Srirangam in Tamil Nadu are examples of this style. Vijayanagara art includes wall-paintings such as the Dashavatara and Girijakalyana (marriage of Parvati, Shiva's consort) in the Virupaksha Temple at Hampi, the Shivapurana murals (tales of Shiva) at the Virabhadra temple at Lepakshi, and those at the Kamaakshi and Varadaraja temples at Kanchi. This mingling of the South Indian styles resulted in a new idiom of art not seen in earlier centuries, a focus on reliefs in addition to sculpture differing from that previously in India.

An aspect of Vijayanagara architecture that shows the cosmopolitanism of the great city is the presence of many secular structures bearing Islamic features. While political history concentrates on the ongoing conflict between the Vijayanagara empire and the Deccan Sultanates, the architectural record reflects a more creative interaction. There are many arches, domes and vaults that show these influences. The concentration of structures like pavilions, stables and towers suggests they were for use by royalty. The decorative details of these structures may have been absorbed into Vijayanagara architecture during the early 15th century, coinciding with the rule of Deva Raya I and Deva Raya II. These kings are known to have employed many Muslims in their army and court, some of whom may have been Muslim architects. This harmonious exchange of architectural ideas must have happened during rare periods of peace between the Hindu and Muslim kingdoms. The "Great Platform" (Mahanavami Dibba) has relief carvings in which the figures seem to have the facial features of central Asian Turks who were known to have been employed as royal attendants.

List of rulers 

The Vijayanagara Empire was ruled by four different dynasties for about 310 years.

Travellers 

In 1442, Abdul Razzaq, who visited from Persia, described it as a city with seven layers of forts, with outer layers for agriculture, crafts and residence, the inner third to seventh layers very crowded with shops and bazaars (markets).

In 1520, Domingo Paes, a Portuguese traveller, visited Vijayanagara as a part of trade contingent from Portuguese Goa. He wrote his memoir as Chronica dos reis de Bisnaga, in which he stated Vijayanagara was "as large as Rome, and very beautiful to the sight ... the best provided city in the world". According to Paes, "there are many groves within it, in the gardens of the houses, many conduits of water which flow into the midst of it, and in places there are lakes ...".

Cesare Federici, an Italian merchant and traveller, visited a few decades after the 1565 defeat and collapse of the Vijayanagara Empire. According to Sinopoli, Johansen, and Morrison, Federici described it as a very different city. He wrote, "the citie of Bezeneger (Hampi-Vijayanagara) is not altogether destroyed, yet the houses stand still, but emptie, and there is dwelling in them nothing, as is reported, but Tygres and other wild beasts".

The historian Will Durant, in his Our Oriental Heritage: The Story of Civilization recites the story of Vijayanagara and calls its conquest and destruction a discouraging tale. He writes, "its evident moral is that civilization is a precarious thing, whose delicate complex of order and liberty, culture and peace" may at any time be overthrown by war and ferocious violence.

Fictional representations 
 Vijayanagar is a key inspiration for the fictional city and empire of Bisnaga in Salman Rushdie's novel  Victory City.

See also

 History of India
 History of South India
 Vijayanagara military
 Political history of medieval Karnataka
Taxation in medieval India

Notes

References

Sources

External links

 

 
States and territories established in 1336
States and territories disestablished in 1646
Medieval Karnataka
Historical Hindu kingdoms
History of Karnataka
Former empires